Santa Barbara is a former settlement in Dona Ana County, New Mexico, now the site of Hatch, New Mexico.

History
Santa Barbara was first established by native New Mexican farmers in 1851, along the road between the Jornada del Muerto and Cooke's Wagon Road northwest of the San Diego Crossing.  Apache raids soon drove them away until 1853 when Fort Thorn, was constructed nearby to the west northwest that protected it from the raids of the Apache.

Following the abandonment of Fort Thorn in 1859, the fort continued to be the location of the Apache Agency of Dr. Michael Steck. However the Agency and Santa Barbara were abandoned in 1860 in the face resumed Navajo raiding.  Hatch was later founded in 1875, on the site of Santa Barbara.

References

Ghost towns in New Mexico
History of Doña Ana County, New Mexico
Geography of Doña Ana County, New Mexico